Ioan Myrddin Lewis FBA (January 30, 1930 – March 14, 2014), popularly known as I. M. Lewis, was a professor emeritus of anthropology at the London School of Economics.

Early life and education
Born in Scotland to a Welsh father and a Scottish mother, Lewis lived in Glasgow after the death of his father during his childhood.

He was educated at Glasgow High School before receiving a Bachelor of Science in Chemistry from the University of Glasgow in 1951. He proceeded to St Catherine's College, Oxford, where he obtained a diploma in Anthropology in 1952 with the aid of a grant from the Nuffield Foundation, and a Bachelor of Letters in 1953. He studied under Franz Steiner and social anthropologist Sir Edward Evan Evans-Pritchard, who was himself an authority on the Nuer and Azande people of South Sudan, as a graduate student – finishing with a doctorate in 1957.

Steiner was working on a multi-language bibliography on the Somali, Afar (Danakil), and Saho peoples, a project for the International African Institute.  After his death, Lewis completed the task of bringing it to publication.

Career
He was renowned internationally as the foremost scholar on Somali history and culture, on which he has published numerous articles and books. Zitelmann characterized him as "the doyen of 'Somali studies'".

Lewis taught at the University of Rhodesia. Returning to the United Kingdom, he lectured at Glasgow and UCL. He then proceeded to the London School of Economics and Political Science in 1969 as a professor, where he remained until his retirement in 1992. "In 1969 Lewis was considered to be the youngest professor in Great Britain." He was also the editor of Man (Journal of the Royal Anthropological Institute; 1959–1972), as well as the Honorary Director of the London-based International African Institute from 1982 to 1988.

His academic interests in Somalia were broad, including published studies in varied fields:
Somali and other oral poetry in the Horn of Africa;
clan, nation, state building and failure in Somalia and beyond;
types of Islam among the Somali and in sub-Saharan Africa;
possession cults and ecstatic religions;
last but not least taking position in general anthropology.

Lewis was not appreciated by the Somali President Siyad Barre (1969–1990), so he and his team were prevented from conducting a planned refugee survey in Somalia on behalf of the UNHCR.

He died on 14th March 2014 and was buried on the eastern side of Highgate Cemetery.

Selected bibliography

Books

Journal articles

References

1930 births
2014 deaths
Burials at Highgate Cemetery
20th-century anthropologists
Scottish anthropologists
Academic staff of the University of Zimbabwe
Fellows of the British Academy
Academics of the London School of Economics
Alumni of St Catherine's College, Oxford
Alumni of the University of Glasgow